Clube de Regatas Brasil, commonly referred to as CRB, is a Brazilian professional football club based in Maceió, Alagoas. It competes in the Série B, the second tier of Brazilian football, as well as in the Campeonato Alagoano, the top flight of the Alagoas state football league.

Founded on 20 September 1912, its greatest rival is CSA, and it plays in white and red shirts, shorts and socks.

History
The club was founded on 20 September 1912 by Lafaiete Pacheco, former member of Clube Alagoano de Regatas. He was dissatisfied with the precarious conditions of his former club. Aroldo Cardoso Zagallo, father of Mário Jorge Lobo Zagallo, worked at the club in 1913 as the football department boss.

Four years later, in 1916, CRB bought an estate in Pajuçara neighborhood and built its football field where is now Severiano Gomes Stadium.

CRB-CSA derby history

CRB and CSA is a traditional Alagoas state derby.

Numbers of the derby
Games: 474
CRB wins: 171
Draws: 156
CSA wins: 148
CRB goals: 579
CSA goals: 606

Biggest win: CRB 6–0 CSA on 1 October 1939, in the game that was known as "Jogo da Sofia" (Sofia's game), which is a reference to a goat named Sofia and owned by CRB's forward Arlindo, as the goat is the number six animal in Jogo do Bicho.

Stadium

The club plays at Estádio Rei Pelé, which has a maximum capacity of 19,105 people.

Achievements
Campeonato Alagoano: 31
1927, 1930, 1937, 1938, 1939, 1940, 1950, 1951, 1961, 1964, 1969, 1970, 1972, 1973, 1976, 1977, 1978, 1979, 1983, 1986, 1987, 1992, 1993, 1995, 2002, 2012, 2013, 2015, 2016, 2017, 2020

Torneio José Américo Filho (Cup of Northeast): 1
1975

Copa do Nordeste: 0
Runners-up (1): 1994

Campeonato Brasileiro Série C: 0
Runners-up (1): 2011

Current squad

Out on loan

All presidents in club history

1910s and 1920s
  Luís Toledo Pizza Sobrinho (1912–13)
  João Viana de Souza (1913–14)
  Casimiro Movilha (1914–15)
  Homero Viegas (1915–17)
  Pedro Lima (1917–18)
  Ismael Acioli (1918–20)
  Raul Brito (1920–25)
  Pedro Oliveira Rocha (1925–26)
  Armando Melo (1926–27)  (1927 – 1st title) 
  Pedro Lima (1927–28)
  Juvêncio Lessa (1928–29)
  Pedro Oliveira Rocha (1929–30)  (1930 – 2nd title)

1930s and 1940s
  Raul Brito (1930–31)
  Ismael Acioli (1931–32)
  Dalmário Souza (1931–32)
  Emílio de Maya (1933–34)
  Pedro Claudino Duarte (1934–36)
  Fábio Araújo (1936–39)
  Mauro Paiva (1937–39)  (1937 – 3rd title / 1938 – 4th title) 
  Mário Gomes de Barros (1939–40)  (1939 – 5th title) 
  Rui Palmeira (1940–41)   (1940 – 6th title) 
  Jaques de Azevedo (1941–42)
  Mauro Paiva (1942–43)
  Aristides Torres (1943–44)
  Paulo de Miranda Neto (1944–45)
  Mauro Paiva (1945–47)
  Gal. Mário de Carvalho Lima (1947–48)
  Ulisses Marinho (1948–54)  (1950 – 7th title / 1951 – 8th title)

1950s and 1960s
  Ulisses Marinho (1948–54)  (1950 – 7th title / 1951 – 8th title) 
  Luís Duda Calado (1954–55)
  Djalma Loureiro (1955–56)
  Roberto Castro (1956–57)
  Aluizio Freitas Melro (1956–57)
  Severiano Gomes Filho (1958–62)  (1961 – 9th title) 
  Oswaldo Gomes de Barros (1962–66)   (1964 – 10th title) 
  Severiano Gomes Filho (1966–67)
  Walter Pitombo Laranjeiras (1967–68)
  Divaldo Cavalcante Suruagy (1968–69)
  Naftalli Edgar Setton (1969–70)  (1969 – 11th title)

1970s and 1980s
  Oswaldo Gomes de Barros (1970–71)  (1970 – 12th title) 
  Luiz Renato de Paiva Lima (1971–73)  (1972 – 13th title / 1973 – 14th title) 
  Cláudio Regis (1973–74)
  Fernando Azevedo D’Aldeia (1974–75)
  Luiz Gonzaga Mendes de Barros (1975–76)
  José Santana de Melo (1976–77)  (1976 – 15th title) 
  Afrânio Lages Filho (1977–79)   (1977 – 16th title / 1978 – 17th title / 1979 – 18th title) 
  José Otávio Moreira Filho (1979–82)
  Oswaldo Gomes de Barros (1982–84)  (1983 – 19th title) 
  José de Medeiros Tavares (1984–85)
  Waldemar Correia da Silva (1985–87)  (1985 – 20th title / 1986 – 21st title) 
  Carlos Alberto Fernande Antunes (1987–88)
  José Luiz Malta Argolo (1988–89)
  Walter Pitombo Laranjeiras (1989–90)

1990s and 2000s
  Paulo Roberto Magalhães Nunes (1990–91)
  Manoel Gomes de Barros (1991–92)  (1992 – 22nd title) 
  José Marcelo de Medeiros Rocha (1992–93)
  Waldemar Correia da Silva (1993–94)  (1993 – 23rd title) 
  Flávio Gomes de Barros (1994–95)  (1995 – 24th title) 
  Walter Pitombo Laranjeiras (1995–98)
  Wilton Antonio Figueiroa Lima (1998–99), (2007–08)
  José Cabral da Rocha Barros (1999–04), (2006)  (2002 – 25th title) 
  Celso Luiz Tenório Brandão (2004–06)
  Wilton Antônio Figueiroa Lima (2007–08)

References

External links

Official website
CRB-NET

 
Association football clubs established in 1912
Football clubs in Alagoas
Maceió
1912 establishments in Brazil